Members of the New South Wales Legislative Assembly who served in the seventh parliament of New South Wales held their seats from 1872 to 1874. The 182 election was held between 13 February and 28 March 1872 with parliament first meeting on 30 April 1872. There were 72 members elected for 52 single member electorates, 6 two member electorates and 2 four member electorates. The maximum term of this parliament was 3 years. However the assembly was dissolved after 32 months. Henry Parkes was the premier for the duration of the parliament. The Speaker was William Arnold.

See also
First Parkes ministry
Results of the 1872 New South Wales colonial election
Candidates of the 1872 New South Wales colonial election

Notes
There was no party system in New South Wales politics until 1887. Under the constitution, ministers were required to resign to recontest their seats in a by-election when appointed. These by-elections are only noted when the minister was defeated; in general, he was elected unopposed.

References

Members of New South Wales parliaments by term
19th-century Australian politicians